Gontaud-de-Nogaret is a commune in the Lot-et-Garonne department in south-western France.

People
The village was the home of Henri Pépin, a prosperous houseowner and cycling enthusiast who employed two helpers to pace him around the Tour de France in 1906. Pépin—sometimes wrongly described as a baron—had no interest in winning the race. Instead, he paid his helpers to lead him to the best restaurants and hotels they could find. Some days they finished more than 12 hours behind the winner.

See also
 Communes of the Lot-et-Garonne department

References

Gontauddenogaret